The Peripheral Ring Road or Satellite Town Ring Road (STRR) (NH-948A) is a 280.8 km ring road that runs around Bangalore, Karnataka, India, which is outside of Outer Ring Road, Bangalore,which is a 60-kilometre-long road.The project is being developed by the National Highways Authority of India (NHAI) under Bharatmala Pariyojana.The entire STRR project involves a length of 367 km around Bengaluru that will connect the eight major satellite towns. Of this, NHAI will build 240-km expressway.

The NHAI is targeting to complete the first phase, involving the 82-km stretch between Dobbspet and Ramanagara, in about three years. Another 30-km stretch between Dobbespet and Magadi is being built under K-SHIP.

The NHAI has divided the STRR project into three phases, said RK Suryawanshi, regional officer at NHAI, Bengaluru. The NHAI, he said, would take up Phase III ahead of Phase II. The second phase would be taken up next year. Another NHAI official said the 56-km Phase II has been kept on hold as it passes through the boundaries of eco-sensitive Bannerghatta National Park.

The reason for creating the PRR was to decongest the Outer Ring Road which currently acts as a by-pass to the city with more than 10,000 trucks using it. According to BDA's project report, with the immense growth in intra-city traffic, the ORR is under tremendous pressure already. The city has already extended beyond the ORR which is a key factor in the increasing pressure on ORR. In order to relieve the traffic pressure on the ORR and the major road networks of the city, a peripheral ring road (PRR) of 116 km was planned outside of the ORR. This stretch is planned to not only improve connectivity of areas beyond the ORR, but also ease the congestion on the ORR. The BDA was focussed on the first phase of the project from Hosur Road to Tumakuru Road with a distance of 67 km.

Project updates
The Ministry of Environment, Forest and Climate Change (MoEF&CC) has accorded terms of reference (ToR) for development of Satellite Town Ring Road (STRR) Phase-I.

The project envisages development of STRR Phase-I of NH-948A from Dobbaspete to Ramanagara (0.000 km to 82.200 km) 82.20 km in Ramanagara District, Karnataka.

S&P Infrastructure Developers – Skylark Infra Engineering JV Wins Bangalore Satellite Town Ring Road’s Package 2

Deadline is March 2024

https://bangaloremirror.indiatimes.com/bangalore/others/satellite-ring-road-eyes-march-2024-launch/articleshow/98741261.cms

https://timesofindia.indiatimes.com/blogs/voices/bangalore-realty-to-shine-brighter-in-2023-with-upcoming-infra/

https://www.projectstoday.com/News/ToR-accorded-for-Satellite-Town-Ring-Road-Phase-Ihttps://www.projectstoday.com/News/ToR-accorded-for-Satellite-Town-Ring-Road-Phase-I

References 

Ring roads in India
Roads in Bangalore